is a retired Japanese athlete who specialised in the 400 metres hurdles. She was the former national record holder in the event and first Japanese female hurdler to run under 57 and 56 seconds. She won several medals at the regional level.

She retired in November 2014 and became the coach of Toho Bank Athletics Club.

Competition record

National titles
Japanese Championships
400 metres - 2002, 2003
400 metres hurdles - 2000, 2001, 2002, 2003, 2004, 2006

Personal bests
Outdoor
 400 metres – 53.20 (Yokohama 2003)
 800 metres – 2:06.24 (Kobe 2006)
 400 metres hurdles – 55.89 (Yokohama 2003): Former national record
 4 × 400 metres relay - 3:30.53 (Osaka 2007): Former national record

Indoor
 400 metres – 55.13 (Tianjin 2003)
 800 metres – 2:15.65 (Maebashi 1999)
 4 × 400 metres relay - 3:38.43 (Yokohama 2003): Current national record

Masters national record holder
 400 metres hurdles – 59.50 (Yamaguchi 2014): Current W35 national record

References

External links

Makiko Yoshida at JAAF  (archived)
Makiko Yoshida at Toho Bank 

1976 births
Living people
Fukushima University alumni
Sportspeople from Fukushima Prefecture
Japanese female hurdlers
World Athletics Championships athletes for Japan
Athletes (track and field) at the 2002 Asian Games
Athletes (track and field) at the 2006 Asian Games
Asian Games competitors for Japan
Japan Championships in Athletics winners
Japanese athletics coaches
21st-century Japanese women